Spitali is a village in the Limassol District of Cyprus, located 1 km east of Paramytha. The altitude of the village is approximately 300 m

Aerial cableway

The remains of an aerial cableway can be seen on the northern hills; remains of a building and foundations for the cable gantries can be found. This cableway was used to transport asbestos from the open cast mine at Amiantos, Troods to a loading point in Limassol. A gantry foundation can also be found on the southern hills.

Churches 

There are two Greek Orthodox churches in the village, Agia Anna and Agios Nikolaos.

References

Communities in Limassol District